John H. Lynch (February 5, 1857 – April 20, 1923) was a Major League Baseball pitcher from 1881 to 1890. He played for the Buffalo Bisons, New York Metropolitans, and Brooklyn Gladiators.

His pitch selection included a drop curve and an "inshoot", which was probably the modern screwball.

The New York Clipper wrote of Jack Lynch:
Studying the in-and-out curves, rises, and drop deliveries, he rapidly acquired a reputation as an effective and puzzling pitcher...He has complete control of the ball, with all the curves and varying paces in delivery, and is cool and self-possessed.

References

External links

1857 births
1923 deaths
Major League Baseball pitchers
19th-century baseball players
Buffalo Bisons (NL) players
New York Metropolitans players
Brooklyn Gladiators players
Fordham Rams baseball coaches
Fordham Rams baseball players
Baseball players from New York City
New Bedford (minor league baseball) players
New Haven (minor league baseball) players
Hartford (minor league baseball) players
Washington Nationals (minor league) players
Nationals of Washington players
New York Metropolitans (minor league) players
Scranton Miners players
Lowell Chippies players
Burials at Gate of Heaven Cemetery (Hawthorne, New York)